The 1985–86 Minnesota North Stars season was the North Stars' 19th season.

Coached by Lorne Henning, the team compiled a record of 38–33–9 for 85 points, to finish the regular season 2nd in the Norris Division. In the playoffs they lost the division semi-finals 3–2 to the St. Louis Blues.

Offseason

Regular season

Final standings

Schedule and results

Playoffs

Player statistics

Awards and records

Transactions

Draft picks
Minnesota's draft picks at the 1985 NHL Entry Draft held at the Metro Toronto Convention Centre in Toronto, Ontario.

Farm teams

See also
1985–86 NHL season

References

External links

Minnesota North Stars seasons
Minnesota North Stars
Minnesota North Stars
Minnesota North Stars
Minnesota North Stars